The Associação de Futebol de Coimbra (Coimbra Football Association) is one of the 22 District Football Associations that are affiliated to the Portuguese Football Federation. The AF Coimbra administers lower tier football in the district of Coimbra.

Background 
Associação de Futebol de Coimbra, commonly referred to as AF Coimbra, is the governing body for football in the district of Coimbra. The football association is based in Coimbra. The association's president is Apolino Manuel dos Santos Pereira.

The organisation was founded on 22 October 1922 following meetings held at Sport Clube Conimbricense. The provisional constitution was prepared by Dr. Mário Machado, Manuel  Camões, João  Barata and Lt. Ribeiro da Costa.

Competitions
Coimbra clubs compete in two of the three national levels of the Portuguese football league system in competitions run by the Portuguese League for Professional Football (Primeira Liga and Segunda Liga) and Portuguese Football Federation (Campeonato Nacional de Seniores). Associação Académica de Coimbra – O.A.F. play in the Primeira Liga and União de Coimbra competes in honor division, of Coimbra Football Association. 

The Campeonato Nacional de Seniores the competitions are organised at a district level (known in Portuguese as distritais) with each district association organising its competitions according to geographical and other factors. The AF Coimbra runs two league competitions known as the Division of Honour (honra) at the fourth level of the league system and two series below, 1ª divisão (série A) and 1ª divisão (série B), at the fifth level.

In more general terms the AF Coimbra currently organises district championships for football and futsal for men and women for all age groups including senior, junior, youth, beginners, infants, and schools.

Notable clubs affiliated to AF Coimbra

 Académica de Coimbra
 União de Coimbra

Divisions – 2013–14 season

The AF Coimbra runs the following divisions covering the fourth and fifth tiers of the Portuguese football league system.

Honra

Ançã Futebol Clube
Associação Académica de Coimbra
Associação Atlética de Arganil
Associação Desportiva de Lagares da Beira
Associação Desportiva de Poiares
Associação Educativa  e Recreativa de Góis
Clube Desportivo e Recreativo Penelense
F.C. Oliveira do Hospital
União de Coimbra

Febres Sport Clube
Grupo Desportivo Pampilhosense
Grupo Recreativo O Vigor da Mocidade
Real Clube Brasfemes
Touring Clube da Praia de Mira
União Clube Eirense
União Desportiva da Tocha

1ª divisão – série A

Associação Desportiva de São Mamede
Associação Desportiva e Cultural da Adémia
Associação Desportiva e Cultural de S. Pedro de Alva
Clube Académico das Gândaras - Recreativo Cultural Social
Clube Condeixa Associação Cultural e Desportiva
Clube Desportivo Lousanense
Clube Recreativo Agrário Desportivo de Lamas
Grupo Desportivo dos Moínhos
Mocidade Futebol Clube

1ª divisão – série B

Académica O.A.F. B
Associação Cultural Desportiva e Solidariedade de Vinha da Raínha
Clube de Futebol Marialvas
Esperança Atlético Clube
Futebol Clube de S. Silvestre
Grupo Desportivo Cova-Gala
Grupo Desportivo de Sepins
Grupo Desportivo Os Águias
Sporting Clube Ribeirense

Historic champions

Titles
 Académica – 18
 União de Coimbra – 7

See also
 Portuguese football competitions
 List of football clubs in Portugal

References 

Coimbra
Sports organizations established in 1922